The University of Matanzas "Camilo Cienfuegos" (Spanish: Universidad de Matanzas "Camilo Cienfuegos", UM) is a public university located in Matanzas, Cuba. It was founded in 1972 and is organized in six faculties.

Organization
These are the six faculties in which the university is divided into:

 Faculty of Agriculture
 Faculty of Social Sciences and Humanities
 Faculty of Physical Education
 Faculty of Engineering - Economics
 Faculty of Informatics
 Faculty of Chemistry - Mechanics

See also 

Education in Cuba
List of universities in Cuba

External links
 University of Matanzas Website 
 Matanzas Science Web portal 
 University of Matanzas - Unofficial website

Universities in Cuba
Buildings and structures in Matanzas
Educational institutions established in 1972
1972 establishments in Cuba